Bangladeshi spices include a variety of spices that are grown across South and Southeast Asia. Many of the spices are native to the region of Bangladesh, while the others were imported from similar climates and have since been cultivated locally for centuries.

Spices are typically heated in a pan with ghee or cooking oil before being added to a dish. Lighter spices are added last, and spices with strong flavor should be added first. Curry is not a spice, but a term which refers to any side dish in Bangladeshi cuisine. It could be with a sauce base or a dry item. A curry typically contains several spices blended together.

List of Bangladeshi spices
Below is a list of spices and other flavoring substances commonly used in Bangladesh.

See also
Bangladeshi cuisine
Spice trade

References

Bengali cuisine
Bengali cuisine